Thomson (originally called Slashes) is a city in McDuffie County, Georgia, United States. The population was 6,814 at the 2020 census. The city is the county seat of McDuffie County. Thomson's nickname is "The Camellia City of the South", in honor of the thousands of camellia plants throughout the city. Thomson was founded in 1837 as a depot on the Georgia Railroad. It was renamed in 1853 for railroad official John Edgar Thomson and incorporated February 15, 1854 as a town and in 1870 as a city. It is part of the Augusta – Richmond County Metropolitan Statistical Area.

History
Thomson, originally called "Slashes", was founded in 1837 as a depot on the Georgia Railroad. It was renamed in 1853 for railroad official John Edgar Thomson. In 1870, Thomson was designated seat of the newly formed McDuffie County. It was incorporated as a town in 1854 and as a city in 1870.

The Old Rock House, built in 1785, is said to be one of Georgia's oldest documented houses with its original design intact. Built by Thomas Ansley, the home is said to be the home of ancestors of former president Jimmy Carter.

Thomson was home to minor league baseball. An affiliate of the Baltimore Orioles, the Thomson Orioles became members of the 1956 six–team the Class D level Georgia State League. Playing home games at The Brickyard, Thomson led the league in attendance and qualified for the playoffs. The Georgia State League permanently folded following the 1956 season.

Geography
Thomson is located at  (33.467346, −82.499450).

Thomson is considered part of the Central Savannah River Area geographical designation.

Demographics

2020 census

As of the 2020 United States census, there were 6,814 people, 2,581 households, and 1,610 families residing in the city.

2000 census
As of the census of 2000, there were 6,828 people, 2,609 households, and 1,792 families residing in the city. The racial makeup of the city was 42.38% White, 56.28% African American, 0.07% Native American, 0.28% Asian, 0.03% Pacific Islander, 0.23% from other races, and 0.72% from two or more races. Hispanic or Latino of any race were 1.27% of the population.

There were 2,609 households, out of which 36.2% had children under the age of 18 living with them, 35.7% were married couples living together, 28.4% had a female householder with no husband present, and 31.3% were non-families. 28.2% of all households were made up of individuals, and 12.6% had someone living alone who was 65 years of age or older. The average household size was 2.50 and the average family size was 3.05.

In the city, the population was spread out, with 28.6% under the age of 18, 9.3% from 18 to 24, 27.2% from 25 to 44, 19.6% from 45 to 64, and 15.3% who were 65 years of age or older. The median age was 34 years. For every 100 females, there were 81.3 males. For every 100 females age 18 and over, there were 73.5 males.

The median income for a household in the city was $23,179, and the median income for a family was $30,015. Males had a median income of $25,882 versus $20,607 for females. The per capita income for the city was $14,976. 27.6% of the population and 23.8% of families were below the poverty line. 1.7% of those under the age of 18 and 100% of those 65 and older were living below the poverty line.

Landmarks
Rock House (1785) – Oldest stone residence in Georgia
Hickory Hill – Home of US senator Thomas E. Watson (1856–1922), noted author, statesman, and lawyer; known as the father of Rural Free Delivery

Education 
The McDuffie County School District holds pre-school to grade twelve, and consists of four elementary schools, a middle school, a high school and an alternative school. The district has 262 full-time teachers and over 4,312 students.
Dearing Elementary School
Maxwell Elementary School
Norris Elementary School
Thomson Elementary School
Thomson Middle School
Thomson High School
McDuffie County Achievement Center

Notable people
Zebedee Armstrong, outsider artist
Casper Brinkley, former defensive end for the NFL's Carolina Panthers
Jasper Brinkley, linebacker for the NFL's New York Giants
Vonteego Cummings, former professional basketball guard, played in the NBA and the Euroleague
Darius Eubanks, linebacker for the NFL'S Dallas Cowboys
Ray Guy, NFL punter for the Oakland Raiders and namesake of the Ray Guy Award, presented each year to college football's top punter. He is the first and only punter admitted to the Pro Football Hall of Fame.
Richard E. Hawes, Navy admiral, World War II hero, and namesake of guided missile frigate USS Hawes
Eddie Lee Ivery, running back for the Georgia Tech Yellow Jackets and the Green Bay Packers
Millie Jackson, R & B singer
Franklin Langham, PGA Tour golfer (1992–2005)
Dr. Wendell Logan, jazz composer and Guggenheim Fellowship recipient.  Dr. Logan established the jazz department at the Oberlin Conservatory of Music
Jerry Mays, running back for the Georgia Tech Yellow Jackets and the San Diego Chargers
Blind Willie McTell, singer and blues musician, wrote "Statesboro Blues". Thomson sponsors an annual blues festival in his honor
Chris Mohr, NFL punter for the Tampa Bay Buccaneers, Buffalo Bills and Atlanta Falcons (1989–2004); published songwriter
Rev. Romulus Moore, one of the first African-American legislators in the Georgia State Assembly, and one of the founding fathers of the civil rights movement.
Brothers Robert Paschal and James Paschal, notable Atlanta restaurateurs and civil rights advocates
Ken Roberson, Broadway choreographer noted for his work in the 2004 Tony Award-winning "Avenue Q" and "All Shook Up;" movie credits as choreographer include HBO's "Lackawanna Blues" and independent film "Preaching to the Choir"
Tom Watson, U.S. senator, Populist Party leader, and renowned orator of the late 19th century.  Noted for establishing Rural Free Delivery, which set up rural mail service for the nation

References

External links

Cities in Georgia (U.S. state)
Cities in McDuffie County, Georgia
County seats in Georgia (U.S. state)
Augusta metropolitan area